The Netherlands Football League Championship 1910–1911 was contested by seventeen teams participating in two divisions. The national champion would be determined by a play-off featuring the winners of the eastern and western football division of the Netherlands. Sparta Rotterdam won this year's championship by beating GVC Wageningen 1-0 and 5–1.

New entrants
Eerste Klasse West:
VOC
Bredania/'t Zesde (playing in the eastern division last season)

Divisions

Eerste Klasse East

Eerste Klasse West

Championship play-off

Sparta Rotterdam won the championship.

References
RSSSF Netherlands Football League Championships 1898-1954
RSSSF Eerste Klasse Oost
RSSSF Eerste Klasse West

Netherlands Football League Championship seasons
1910–11 in Dutch football
Netherlands